Creatio is a global vendor of one platform to automate workflows and CRM with no-code and a maximum degree of freedom.  

Creatio offerings include a Studio Creatio (no-code platform), CRM applications: Marketing Creatio (marketing automation tool), Sales Creatio (sales force automation software) and Service Creatio (help desk software), industry workflows (Workflow) for 20 verticals and marketplace add-ons. 

Creatio is headquartered in Boston, MA, and has offices in five regions around the world. Creatio’s founder and CEO is Katherine Kostereva.  

In February 2021, Creatio raised $68 million in a round led by Volition Capital with participation from Horizon Capital.

In February 2022, Creatio released 8 Atlas — the evolution of its platform with the next-level tools to empower creators to build enterprise applications and workflows.

History
Creatio was introduced as bpm'online on February 8, 2011. bpm'online CRM system was the first product developed on the platform.

In November 2011, bpm'online platform won CRM Idol EMEA award. Paul Greenberg, a CRM expert, explained the jury’s choice by saying, “It is one of the best graphical designers I’ve seen and actually does make it easy for the non-techie to develop a process that can be injected into a sales component or a marketing function or across the entire enterprise… Clean and easy to use with a very powerful tool set that allows complex process creation from, maybe not novices, but non-technical users.” At that time it had customer data management, sales management, campaign management, time management and document management functions.

Version 5.2, released in December 2011, introduced significant upgrades that allowed organizations to better manage customer data and interactions across social media (Facebook, LinkedIn and Twitter) and introduced Google Maps integration.

In January 2012, the software was included into “The CRM Watchlist”, compiled by Paul Greenberg, for the first time. bpm'online also won this award in 2013, 2014, 2016 and 2020.

Early in 2013, apps for Android and iOS were launched. In June 2013, version 7.0, the next generation of the application development platform, was released.

Version 7.3, released in June 2014, featured an enterprise social network and Microsoft Exchange integration among other options.

In March 2015, Forrester Research for the first time included bpm’online in its “Forrester Wave” review of top-10 CRM solutions for midsize organizations. In April, the product was first featured in Gartner Magic Quadrant for the Customer Engagement Center (customer service and support software) and it has been included in the report every year since then. In June 2015, version 7.6 was released with major updates to sales, marketing and customer service modules.

In February 2016, Forrester Research for the first time included bpm’online in its “Forrester Wave” research on cloud-based dynamic case management, reviewing version 7.7 of the platform. Versions 7.8 and 7.9, released in 2016, introduced more functionality to simplify the platform for users with no technical background and enhance their ability to set up user interfaces and develop business processes.

In October 2017, version 7.11 was released. Some key updates included new machine learning capabilities and predictive algorithms, improved marketing campaigns designer, extended BPM and case management capabilities as well as mobile app enhancements.

In March 2018, Forrester Research included bpm’online into its “Forrester Wave” research on cloud-based dynamic case management, reviewing version 7.11 of the platform. The reviewers placed bpm’online platform in “Strong performers” category. They highlighted that bpm’online has over “150 case templates and apps available in an external community” and added that the platform is often as “a lighter and low-code alternative to Pegasystems.” In April, Gartner included bpm’online into its Magic Quadrant for Enterprise High-Productivity Application Platform as a Service.

In March 2019, Forrester Research included bpm’online low-code platform into its top-10 digital process automation providers research. The researchers evaluated version 7.13 of the platform and placed it into “Strong performers” category. In April 2019, version 7.14 was released, which added a customer and partner portal to the platform in addition to several design tools for further customization of the system. In 2019, Gartner acknowledged bpm’online as the “Leader” in two Magic Quadrants, CRM Lead Management and Sales Force Automation (the software entered these quadrants as a “Niche player” in 2016 for the first time). The research company also included bpm’online into its review of Enterprise Low-Code Application Platforms. In 2019, the software was included in Forrester Wave research of Customer Service Solutions.

In October 2019, the software was renamed from bpm’online to Creatio.

In February 2020, Creatio once again was named the winner of “The CRM Watchlist”. In March 2020, a number of healthcare agencies, hospitals, non-profits and other organizations battling COVID-19 were granted free access to Service Creatio platform. In July 2020, Creatio’s low-code platform became the winner of “People's Choice” Stevie Awards in “Digital Process Automation Solution” nomination.

In February 2021, Creatio raised $68 million in a round led by Volition Capital with participation from Horizon Capital.

Products
Creatio is a Software as a service (SaaS) low-code solution for process management and CRM (customer relationship management. It can be used to automate business tasks, implement rules and develop third party integrations. The framework was built in .NET, customizations and scripts are built either in C# (server side code) or JavaScript (client side code).

In addition to its Studio Creatio (low-code platform) Creatio offers three CRM applications: Sales Creatio (sales force automation software), Marketing Creatio (marketing automation tool) and Service Creatio (help desk software). There is also a Studio Creatio Free, a free tool for managing business processes and building applications.

The most recent version of the Creatio platform (8.0.6) was released in December 2022.

Notes

Works cited

External links
 

Customer relationship management software
.NET software
2011 software
Cloud applications
Marketing software